Buellton is a small city in Santa Barbara County, California, United States. The population was 5,161 at the 2020 census, up from 4,828 at the 2010 census.

Located at the junction of U.S. Route 101 and State Route 246, Buellton attracts many travelers. It is a town which is home to various hotels, restaurants, parks and shops. It may be most famous for its nickname “Home of Split Pea Soup,” which is a reference to Pea Soup Andersen's Restaurant. Buellton traces its beginnings to 1867 when a portion of a Mexican land grant was deeded Rufus T. Buell and his brother. They developed a successful cattle ranch in the 19th century.

History
Buellton is named for Rufus T. Buell, an early settler who owned the Rancho San Carlos de Jonata Mexican land grant. It has been a minor tourist destination since the 1920s, and became increasingly popular after the opening of Pea Soup Andersen's in 1924. This and an abundance of fuel, lodging and other traveler services led Buellton to adopt the nickname "Servicetown, USA."

Buellton has also experienced increased notoriety due to the film Sideways (2004), which was filmed in Buellton and Solvang. The City has gained additional tourism due to many nearby wineries, two popular breweries, and the Flying Flags RV Resort.

Geography
The town is surrounded by miles of open-space land in the Santa Ynez Valley, and borders the Santa Ynez River to the south. It is home to a library, one park, a golf course, fire station, Highway Patrol Office, a shopping plaza, 10 hotels and 18 restaurants.

It is a common stop for travelers on U.S. Highway 101, being the first town north of Santa Barbara after the scenic and undeveloped stretch of about  through the Gaviota Coast.

Demographics

2010
At the 2010 census Buellton had a population of 4,828. The racial makeup of Buellton was 3,912 (81.0%) White, 37 (0.8%) African American, 76 (1.6%) Native American, 137 (2.8%) Asian, 5 (0.1%) Pacific Islander, 424 (8.8%) from other races, and 237 (4.9%) from two or more races. Hispanic or Latino of any race were 1,451 persons (30.1%).

The whole population lived in households, no one lived in non-institutionalized group quarters and no one was institutionalized.

There were 1,761 households, 667 (37.9%) had children under the age of 18 living in them, 1,008 (57.2%) were opposite-sex married couples living together, 168 (9.5%) had a female householder with no husband present, 81 (4.6%) had a male householder with no wife present.  There were 93 (5.3%) unmarried opposite-sex partnerships, and 10 (0.6%) same-sex married couples or partnerships. 385 households (21.9%) were one person and 189 (10.7%) had someone living alone who was 65 or older. The average household size was 2.74.  There were 1,257 families (71.4% of households); the average family size was 3.23.

The population was spread out, with 1,228 people (25.4%) under the age of 18, 391 people (8.1%) aged 18 to 24, 1,229 people (25.5%) aged 25 to 44, 1,343 people (27.8%) aged 45 to 64, and 637 people (13.2%) who were 65 or older.  The median age was 39.1 years. For every 100 females, there were 95.5 males.  For every 100 females age 18 and over, there were 94.2 males.

There were 1,845 housing units at an average density of 1,165.7 per square mile, of the occupied units 1,226 (69.6%) were owner-occupied and 535 (30.4%) were rented. The homeowner vacancy rate was 2.5%; the rental vacancy rate was 4.4%.  3,262 people (67.6% of the population) lived in owner-occupied housing units and 1,566 people (32.4%) lived in rental housing units.

2000
At the 2000 census there were 3,828 people in 1,433 households, including 1,000 families, in the city. The racial makeup of the city was 81.50% White, 0.55% African American, 1.15% Native American, 1.10% Asian, 0.21% Pacific Islander, 12.23% from other races, and 3.27% from two or more races. Hispanic or Latino of any race were 25.73%.

Of the 1,433 households, 34.7% had children under the age of 18 living with them, 58.2% were married couples living together, 8.0% had a female householder with no husband present, and 30.2% were non-families. 23.9% of households were one person, and 10.7% were one person aged 65 or older.  The average household size was 2.67 and the average family size was 3.17.

The age distribution was 27.1% under the age of 18, 6.7% from 18 to 24, 29.6% from 25 to 44, 23.0% from 45 to 64, and 13.6% 65 or older.  The median age was 38 years. For every 100 females, there were 98.5 males.  For every 100 females age 18 and over, there were 94.7 males.

The median income for a household in the city was $48,490, and the median family income  was $54,839. Males had a median income of $46,379 versus $28,542 for females. The per capita income for the city was $20,907.  About 6.6% of families and 8.8% of the population were below the poverty line, including 10.2% of those under age 18 and 7.3% of those age 65 or over.

Education
Buellton has two schools which form the Buellton Union Elementary School District.  Oak Valley Elementary School serves those students in kindergarten through 5th grade while Jonata Middle School serves grades 6 through 8. The district serves approximately 600 students.  In 2019, Jonata Middle School was named a California Distinguished School while the Buellton Union Elementary School District was named a California Exemplary District.

The City is also served by the Santa Ynez Valley Union High School District. Santa Ynez Valley High School is located in Santa Ynez.

Public safety
The Santa Barbara County Sheriff's Office provides contract police services for Buellton, while the Santa Barbara County Fire Department acts as the local fire service through the Santa Barbara County Fire Protection District. California Highway Patrol operates an office in town. The crime rate is low.

Politics and government
As of June 2022, the current mayor of Buellton is Holly Sierra, who was elected in November 2018. Other members of the City Council include Vice Mayor Dave King, Councilmember Ed Andrisek, Councilmember Elysia Lewis, and Councilmember John Sanchez. The mayor is elected to a two-year term, while the City Councilmembers are elected at-large to 4 year terms. The Vice Mayor is selected from among the City Councilmembers each year.

The City recently changed the electoral system for Councilmembers elected beginning in November 2022. From this point forward, Councilmember will be elected by and from one of four districts, each with approximately 1,290 residents.

Activities

OstrichLand USA
OstrichLand USA is a 33-acre Ostrich and Emu farm located in the Buellton area. Visitors can view and feed the animals.

References

External links

 Buellton Historical Society 
Buellton Union School District
Pea Soup Andersen's

Cities in Santa Barbara County, California
Santa Ynez Valley
Incorporated cities and towns in California
1992 establishments in California